OutFest Philadelphia is one of the LGBT Pride Events associated with National Coming Out Day. It is an annual event taking place in the heart of Philadelphia's gayborhood and attracts over 30,000 people. It takes place every year in mid-October.

References

External links

LGBT events in Pennsylvania
LGBT culture in Philadelphia